Greenwar is an adventure published under license by Atlas Games in 1994 for R. Talsorian Games's near-future dystopian role-playing game Cyberpunk 2020.

Plot summary
Greenwar is an adventure in which the player characters are operatives working for the Browning Investment Group, and are tasked with attempting to perform a hostile takeover of Liverpool Shipping. The players are not allowed to use violence; instead, they have been provided with a fixed amount of cash to buy at least 50% of the shares in Liverpool, and must seek out potential sellers, using negotiation, strategy or intimidation. A game mechanic calculates the effect the players' actions have on the share prices of Liverpool, which may make their task easier or more difficult.

Publication history
R. Talsorian Games first published the role-playing game Cyberpunk in 1988, re-releasing a revised version, Cyberpunk 2020 in 1990. Thomas Kane of Atlas Games designed a Cyberpunk 2020 adventure titled Greenwar, with illustrations by Doug Schuler and C. Brent Ferguson, and cover art by Ferguson. Atlas published it under license in 1994.

Reviews
In the November 1994 edition of Dragon (Issue #211), Rick Swan complimented the lack of combat in this adventure, commenting that "Players more interested in muscles than minds should keep their distance; this is high IQ territory." Although he noted that the lack of combat might sound a bit boring, "[designer] Kane's flair for the dramatic keeps it as tense as a castle siege." Swan concluded by giving Greenwar an excellent rating of 5 out of 6, saying, "Greenwar will put hack-n-slashers to sleep. [It extends] the parameters of cyberpunk with off-beat premises [...] [It downplays] high tech mumbo-jumbo in favour of imaginative casts and encounters."

References

Cyberpunk (role-playing game)
Role-playing game supplements introduced in 1994
Science fiction role-playing game adventures